Maria Joan Hyland is an ex-lawyer and the author of three novels: How the Light Gets In (2004), Carry Me Down (2006) and This is How (2009). Hyland is a lecturer in creative writing in the Centre for New Writing at the University of Manchester. Carry Me Down (2006) was shortlisted for the Man Booker Prize and won the Hawthornden Prize and the Encore Prize.

Hyland has twice been longlisted for the Orange Prize (2004 and 2009), the Commonwealth Writers' Prize (2004 and 2007) and This is How (2009) was longlisted for the International IMPAC Dublin Literary Award.

At the University of Manchester she has run fiction workshops alongside Martin Amis (2007–2010), Colm Tóibín (2010–2011) and Jeanette Winterson (2013–present).  Hyland runs regular Fiction Masterclasses in the Guardian Masterclass Programme, has twice been shortlisted for the BBC Short Story Prize (2011 and 2012) and she publishes in The Guardian How to Write series and the Financial Times, the LRB, Granta and elsewhere.

Writing and prizes
Carry Me Down (2006) was shortlisted for the Man Booker Prize and won both the Hawthornden Prize and The Encore Prize and all three novels have been longlisted and short-listed for several prizes: the Orange Prize (2004 and 2009). Carry Me Down has been listed as one of the Top 100 ‘Australian’ Novels of all time by the Society of Authors. 

How the Light Gets In (2004) and Carry Me Down (2006) were shortlisted for the Commonwealth Writers' Prize (2004 and 2007) and This is How (2009) was longlisted for the Dublin International IMPAC Prize and The Orange Prize (2009). Hyland's short story "Even Pretty Eyes Commit Crimes", which was shortlisted for the BBC International Short Story Prize (2012) and first published online by Granta, is story of the week in Narrative Magazine, US.

Short stories
Hyland's short stories have been published in many places, including Zoetrope: All Story (2004, 2005, 2006, 2008), Blackbook Magazine (2004, 2006 & 2007), Best Australian Short Stories (2006 & 2008) and, in September 2011, her short story "Rag Love" was shortlisted for the BBC National Short Story Award. Hyland's "Even Pretty Eyes Commit Crimes" has been published in the anthology Best British Short Stories (2013). Boyd Tonkin from The Independent said of the anthology: "Nicholas Royale has excellent taste, ensuring little explosions of weirdness or transcendence often erupt amid much well-observed everyday life."

Teaching and editing
Hyland runs regular in the Guardian Masterclass Programme, has twice been shortlisted for the BBC Short Story Prize (2011 and 2012) and regularly publishes non-fiction in The Guardian (including in the How to Write series), the Financial Times, the London Review of Books, Lonely Planet, Granta, the Scottish Herald, and elsewhere. Hyland teaches three fiction courses in 2014 in the Curtis Brown (International Literary Agency) programme. Her advice on proof-reading has been cited in The New Scientist.

Public readings and events
Hyland has made more than two dozen appearances on national and international radio, including RTÉ (Ireland), PBS (US), Radio 4 and The BBC World Service, Radio 3, The ABC (Australia) and has been a guest of nine major literary festivals, including the Edinburgh International Festival and Hay-On-Wye.

Hyland has also been appointed writer-in-residence in programmes such as Arizona State University's Workshop Programme (Feb, 2014) & writer-in-residence at Griffith University, Australia (August 2013), and has appeared at the Melbourne Writers' Festival, Crossing Borders, the Netherlands, Segovia, Rome, the Brisbane Writers' Festival (July/August, 2013).

Personal life
In 2008, Hyland was diagnosed with multiple sclerosis, a debilitating neurological disease.

Awards

How the Light Gets In (2004)
 Shortlisted for the Commonwealth Writers' Prize (2004)
 Winner Best Young Novelist, The Sydney Morning Herald
 3rd Prize, Barnes & Noble Discover Great Young Novelists
Carry Me Down (2006)
 Shortlisted for the Man Booker Prize
 Winner of The Hawthornden Prize (2007)
 Winner of The Encore Prize (2007)
 Shortlisted for the Commonwealth Writers' Prize (2006)
This Is How (2009)
 Longlisted for The Orange Prize
 Longlisted for The International Dublin IMPAC Prize 2009
Short fiction:
 Nominated for the Pushcart Prize USA - 2008
 "Rag Love" shortlisted for the BBC Short Story Prize (2011)
 "Even Pretty Eyes Commit Crimes" shortlisted for the BBC International Short Story Prize (2012).
 "Other People's Beds" has been longlisted for the EFG £30,000 Sunday Times Short Story Award (2014)
Essays
 "Hardy Animal" shortlisted for the inaugural William Hazlitt Essay Prize 2013
 Shortlisted for the £15,000 Hazlitt Essay Prize 2013

Reviews

How the Light Gets In
"Hyland is a talented writer grappling with serious questions about how we make our way through the world. . . .' New York Times
"A story with grit and heart from an intelligent, perspicacious writer to watch." Kirkus Reviews
"That Hyland is a talented writer is clear from the novel’s first page." Australian Book Review
"Hyland is an intelligent writing grappling with serious questions about how we make our way through the world." The New York Times
"Heartbreaking and compelling." The Observer
"Expect to be blown away." The Guardian
"A dry and fantastically sarcastic voice..." Time Out, New York
"Spot on." Irish Examiner
"a disturbing work which simmers with edgy brilliance." Sunday Herald
"The best book I read this year..." Mark Cousins, Scotland on Sunday

Carry Me Down (2006)
"Hyland can do humour, horror and pathos all at once..." The Spectator
"This is writing of the highest order..." JM Coetzee
"[Hyland] brings life's uncomprehended complexities horribly alive." The Times

This is How (2009)
"Unflinching, absorbing, morally complex ... an eerie, commanding book ... a novel about crime but not a crime novel ... thrilling, moving and compassionate." The New York Times
"Bleak yet moving, mercilessly dispassionate yet shot through with kindness and wit, it is a profound achievement" Justine Jordan
"A novel of extraordinary power ... Hyland tells her story in a supercharged present tense, tremblingly aware of physical detail." The Guardian
"This is an expertly paced, gripping novel that doesn't falter and never compromises its emotional truth." The Times
"A tour de force. Hyland illuminates this man's damaged soul with such a steely, brilliant clarity that your heart breaks for him." Helen Garner
"When you've been reading Hyland, other writers seem to lack integrity ... whereas she aims straight for the truth and the heart." Hilary Mantel
"Three or four days [after finishing the novel], Hyland's white-hot prose was still smouldering in my head." Financial Times
"She makes it look so simple, with her words of one syllable, with a style almost entirely devoid of affect; but there is nothing simplistic about her achievement." New York Times
"The narrative drive is relentless, surging on and on in the toneless voice of Patrick Oxtoby, Hyland’s protagonist." Philip Womack

Teaching and editing
"The course carries on and, just as I'm starting to get bored by the group discussion, Curtis Brown Creative pulls what is a stroke of genius in the form of four sessions with MJ Hyland. OMFG. I read the first chapter of her book Carry Me Down. Wow, she can write – even if she is writing about teaching a child to drown puppies. I should have worked out what was coming. She is lively, clever and shit-scary in a way that few men are. She is intimidating yet attentive. Comparing her to our tutor is like comparing Guns N' Roses to Otis Redding."  Collette Brown.

Works
 How the Light Gets In, Canongate, 2004. .'
 Carry Me Down, 2006,  (hardback),  (paperback)
 This Is How, 2009, .
 Even Pretty Eyes Commit Crimes – Published by Granta in 2012. Shortlisted for the International BBC Short Story Prize (2012), also Published in Narrative Magazine and Comma Press
 Rag Love – originally published in January 2011 as First-Class Passage. Also published in Australia's major review/politics/ arts & media magazine, The Monthly. Available as a BBC radio broadcast. 
 M. J. Hyland's Short Stories published in Zoetrope: All-Story:
 A Boy, an Ex-Orphanage, and a Trapped Dog, Vol. 10, No. 3:
 Eggshell Skull, Vol. 12, No. 1

References

External links
 

1968 births
Living people
21st-century Australian novelists
21st-century Australian women writers
Australian women novelists
People with multiple sclerosis